Sikasso (Bambara: ߛߌߞߊߛߏ tr. Sikaso) is a city in the south of Mali and the capital of the Sikasso Cercle and the Sikasso Region.  It is Mali's second largest city with 225,753 residents in the 2009 census.

History
Sikasso was founded at the beginning of the nineteenth century by Mansa Douala.  The town was a small village until 1876 when Tieba Traoré, whose mother came from Sikasso, became King of the Kénédougou Empire and moved its capital there.  He established his palace on the sacred Mamelon hill (now home to a water tower) and constructed a tata or fortifying wall to defend against the attacks of both the Malinke conqueror Samori Ture and the French colonial army.  The city withstood a long siege from 1887 to 1888 but fell to the French in 1898. Rather than surrender to the colonial army, Tieba's brother Babemba Traoré, who had succeeded him as king, committed suicide, honoring the famous Bamanankan saying "Saya ka fisa ni maloya ye" (literally: death is preferable to shame).

Attractions today include the large market, Mamelon hill, the remains of Tieba Traoré's tata, and the nearby Missirikoro Grotto.  The festival  takes place every June, celebrating the traditional Malian instrument.

Sikasso's sister city is Brive-la-Gaillarde, France.

Origin of Traoré
The Traoré in sikasso, was living in Gbotola (gbötöla) in kankan préfecture and Région. There was a family in this village that Sibyl informed them to sacrifice their Aunty and leave the town to go to the eastern direction and they'll become the dynasty family which would remain in history. «Their Answer Said: Impossible, we can't accept to sacrifice our Aunty for any Ambitious». 

But Anytimes a new Sibyl Arrived in the village, he (she) could repeat the same proposition, but the Family didn't accept it. One day, Someone else informed their Aunty about the history. Once she got it, she said : «What's good news for my family?If They didn't accept it, I would do it myself». She Prepared herself for sacrifice and Slaughtered herself. 

Somebody informs the family about the news, they organize her funeral and travel to the direction They were to go, and the people trusted them to make them a dynasty family like it was predicted by Sybil. Each year the king was sending the emissary to pray for the aunt, until it was interrupted for fear of Samory. Their latest visit took the time Samory was building his kingdom, Manssa Douala was represented by Tieba Traoré and he inspected the young king's behavior and told everything to his father: a few days after, his father died and he became his successor. 

He give order to find a place where to include the water source inside the fortress, and it was built with a little marsh, and it was the largest fortified fortress ever made in west Africa. He named the new town as sikasso (the doubt town) Sika (doubt) So (town): because it was built of doubt of Samory, he spent 15 months surrounded the fortress of Sikasso, but he didn't access inside and it served for him to lost some parts of his Empire.

Geography
Sikasso's ethnic groups include  the Senufo Bamana,(mainly the Supyire), the Bobo (or Bobo Fing, lit. 'black Bobo'), and the Minianka (Mamara Senufo).

Sikasso has abundant agriculture. Sikasso's fruit and vegetable production guarantees the city's self-sufficiency, sparing it from reliance on international food aid.

Climate
Sikasso features a tropical wet and dry climate under the Köppen climate classification. The city receives just under  of rain each year, most of which falls between May and October. The highest temperatures are reached at the end of the dry season in March and April when the average daily maximum temperatures are just above .

Places of worship   
Among the places of worship, they are predominantly Muslim mosques. There are also Christian churches and temples : Roman Catholic Diocese of Sikasso (Catholic Church), Église Chrétienne Évangélique du Mali (Alliance World Fellowship), Assemblies of God.

See also 
 List of cities in Mali

References

External links 

 Portions of this article were translated from French language Wikipedia's Sikasso.
.
 L'économie locale de Sikasso, Mali. Ecoloc - Gérer l'économie localement en Afrique - Evaluation et prospective, Volume 1, Number 2, Décembre 2002, pp. 1–18 (18).

 
Regional capitals in Mali
Communes of Sikasso Region